Volleyball events were contested at the 1962 Central American and Caribbean Games in Kingston, Jamaica.

References
 

1962 Central American and Caribbean Games
1962
1962 in volleyball
International volleyball competitions hosted by Jamaica